Lachnocnema divergens, the divergent woolly legs, is a butterfly in the family Lycaenidae. It is found in south-eastern Nigeria, Cameroon, Gabon, the Republic of the Congo, the Central African Republic, the Democratic Republic of the Congo, southern Sudan, Uganda, Rwanda, Burundi, Ethiopia, western Kenya and north-western Tanzania. Its habitat consists of forests.

References

Butterflies described in 1915
Miletinae